William Neill may refer to:

William Neill (poet) (1922–2010), Scottish poet
William Neill (rugby league) (1884–1964), Australian rugby league footballer of the early 20th century
William Neill, birth name of Bud Neill (1911–1970), Scottish cartoonist of the mid 20th century
William Neill (politician) (1889–1960), MP for Belfast North
Bill Neill (born 1959), American football defensive lineman
Billy Neill (1929–1997), Irish footballer
Bill Neil (visual effects artist), American visual effects artist
William Neill (priest) (born 1930), Archdeacon of Dromore

See also
Billy Neil (footballer, born 1939) (1939–2014), Scottish football centre-half who represented Great Britain at the 1960 Olympics
Billy Neil (footballer, born 1944), Scottish football winger for Millwall
William Neale (disambiguation)
William Neile (1637–1670), English mathematician
Will E. Neal (1875–1959), physician and politician
William Neel (died 1418), MP
Willie Neil (fl. 1920s), Scottish footballer with Airdrieonians 
William O'Neill (disambiguation)